General Graves may refer to:

Azariah Graves (1768–1850), North Carolina militia general in the War of 1812
Ernest Graves Sr. (1880–1953), U.S. Army brigadier general
Ernest Graves Jr. (1924–2019), U.S. Army lieutenant general
William S. Graves (1865–1940), U.S. Army major general
Howard D. Graves (1939–2003), U.S. Army lieutenant general
Richard G. Graves (born 1933), U.S. Army lieutenant general
William S. Graves (1865–1940), U.S. Army major general

See also
Ivan Grave (1874–1960), Soviet Army major general
General Graves B. Erskine (1897–1973)